"Between the Two of Them" is a song originally recorded by Alabama on their 1992 album American Pride and later recorded by American country music artist Tanya Tucker.  It was released in February 1995 as the first single from the album Fire to Fire.  The song reached #27 on the Billboard Hot Country Singles & Tracks chart.  The song was written by Mickey Cates.

Chart performance

References

1995 singles
1992 songs
Alabama (American band) songs
Tanya Tucker songs
Songs written by Mickey Cates
Song recordings produced by Jerry Crutchfield
Liberty Records singles